Crédin is a commune in the Morbihan department of Brittany in north-western France.

Demographics
Inhabitants of Crédin are called in French Crédinois.

Geography

The canal de Nantes à Brest, which is the canalized river Oust, forms the commune's eastern border.

Map

See also
Communes of the Morbihan department

References

External links

 
 Mayors of Morbihan Association 

Communes of Morbihan
Morbihan communes articles needing translation from French Wikipedia